Bandera High School is a public high school located in Bandera, Texas, United States, and classified as a 4A school by the UIL. It is part of the Bandera Independent School District that serves students in eastern Bandera County. It was named a 2001-02 National Blue Ribbon School In 2014, Bandera High School was ranked 16th of 66 high schools in Children at Risk's High Schools in Greater San Antonio. In 2015, the school was rated "Met Standard" by the Texas Education Agency.

Athletics
The Bandera Bulldogs compete in these sports 

Baseball
Basketball
Cross country running
American football
Golf
Powerlifting
Association football
Softball
 Soccer
Tennis
Track and field
Volleyball

State titles
Girls Cross Country - 
2014(4A)
2015(4A)
2016(4A)
2017(4A)
Football - 
2002(3A/D2)

References

External links
 

Public high schools in Texas
Schools in Bandera County, Texas